"Nobody" is a song written by Kye Fleming and Dennis Morgan, and recorded by American country music artist Sylvia.  It was released in June 1982 as the second single from the album Just Sylvia.

The song was first recorded in 1982 by Sylvia, who was already a country music star, achieving a #1 hit and 2 other top tens in 1981. "Nobody" was her second and final Billboard #1 country hit. The song was so successful, it crossed over to the Billboard Hot 100 charts, debuting on August 21, 1982 (the week the song dropped from #1 Country) and peaking at #15 in November.  "Nobody" spent 20 weeks on the chart; earned a gold record; and was also a top five Adult Contemporary hit.

The song turned young Sylvia into a star on both sides of the charts. Although she gained country-pop success with "Nobody", she never achieved another crossover hit, or for that matter, another Billboard Country Singles #1 hit. The song became Sylvia's signature song and got nominated for a Grammy award in 1983 for Best Female Country Vocal Performance. It also helped her take home the Academy of Country Music (ACM) award for Top Female Vocalist of 1982, a category for which she was never even nominated by the Country Music Association (CMA). The title also received the BMI Song of the Year (1983) award for receiving the most radio airplay.

Charts

Weekly singles charts

Year-end charts

References

1982 songs
Sylvia (singer) songs
1982 singles
Songs written by Kye Fleming
Songs written by Dennis Morgan (songwriter)
Song recordings produced by Tom Collins (record producer)
RCA Records singles